Ivanovskoye is a rural locality (a village) in Markovskoye Rural Settlement, Vologodsky District, Vologda Oblast, Russia. The population was 2 as of 2002.

Geography 
The distance to Vologda is 29 km, to Vasilievskoye is 7 km. Neverovskoye, Frolovskoye, Redkino, Markovo are the nearest rural localities.

References 

Rural localities in Vologodsky District